Scott DuBois (born April 27, 1978) is an American jazz guitarist and composer.

Career 
DuBois studied at the Manhattan School of Music. He recorded two albums featuring saxophonist David Liebman, Monsoon (2004) and Tempest (2006), for the Soul Note record label, three albums, Banshees (2008), Black Hawk Dance (2010) and Landscape Scripture (2012), for Sunnyside Records, and two albums, Winter Light (2015) and Autumn Wind (2017), for the ACT record label. Landscape Scripture was named one of the "Top 10 Jazz Albums of 2012" by National Public Radio. Winter Light was named one of the "Albums of the Year" (2015) by the New York City Jazz Record.

His current quartet consists of Gebhard Ullmann on tenor saxophone and bass clarinet, Thomas Morgan on bass, and Kresten Osgood on drums.

The New York Times described Scott DuBois as having "an equal commitment to knotty compositions and blank-canvas improvisation".

DuBois was named in DownBeat Magazine's 2019 Critics' Poll in the "Rising Star Guitar" Category.

Awards and honors 
 2018 ECHO Award for Autumn Wind album.
2005 Thelonious Monk International Jazz Guitar Competition Semi-Finalist.

Discography 
 Monsoon (Soul Note, 2004)
 Tempest (Soul Note, 2006)
 Banshees (Sunnyside, 2008)
 Black Hawk Dance (Sunnyside, 2010)
 Landscape Scripture (Sunnyside, 2012)
 Winter Light (ACT, 2015)
 Autumn Wind (ACT, 2017)

References

External links 

Scott DuBois on Allmusic

20th-century American guitarists
21st-century American guitarists
American jazz guitarists
American jazz composers
American male jazz composers
1978 births
Living people
20th-century American composers
American male guitarists
20th-century American male musicians
21st-century American male musicians
ACT Music artists
Black Saint/Soul Note artists
Sunnyside Records artists
20th-century jazz composers